Grand Falls Golf Club is a public golf course located in Grand Falls-Windsor, Newfoundland and Labrador, Canada.

History
In 1905, the Anglo-Newfoundland Development Company, as part of the development of the Grand Falls paper mill, cleared land for farming at the intersection of the Exploits River and Rushy Pond Brook. In 1924 some local enthusiasts developed the land into a 6-hole golf course. Soon thereafter it became a 9-hole facility and remained so until 2004 when Graham Cooke's 9-hole addition was added on the opposite side of Rushy Pond Brook.

See also
List of golf courses in Newfoundland and Labrador

References

External links
Official website

Golf clubs and courses in Newfoundland and Labrador
Grand Falls-Windsor